Fire Mountain may refer to:

Mountains and volcanos
 Huoyan Mountain, Taiwan
 Kostal Cone, British Columbia, Canada
 Musuan Peak, Philippines
 Mount Merapi, Indonesia
 Nina Qullu, Oruro, Bolivia
 Nina Qullu (La Paz), Bolivia

Other uses
 Fire Mountain Scout Camp, a Boy Scout camp in Washington state; see 
 Yanar Dag, a natural gas fire which blazes continuously in Azerbaijan
 Fire Mountain, a restaurant chain owned by Buffets, Inc.
 Fire Mountain, an art installation by Czech artist Epos 257

See also
 Jacawitz, a  Guatemalan deity